Dinesh Ahirwar is an Indian politician and a member of the Indian National Congress party.

Career

Political career
He became an MLA in 2013.

Personal life
He is married to Mrs. Tara Devi and has two sons and one daughter.

See also
Madhya Pradesh Legislative Assembly
2013 Madhya Pradesh Legislative Assembly election

References

1964 births
Living people
Indian National Congress politicians from Madhya Pradesh